Rune J. Skjælaaen (born 23 January 1954 in Bergen) is a Norwegian politician for the Centre Party (SP). He was elected to the Norwegian Parliament from Hordaland in 2001.

Parliamentary Committee duties 
2005 - 2009 member of the Standing Committee on Health and Care Services.
2005 - 2009 member of the Electoral Committee.
2001 - 2005 member of the Standing Committee on Education, Research and Church Affairs.
2001 - 2005 deputy member of the Electoral Committee.

External links

1954 births
Living people
Members of the Storting
Centre Party (Norway) politicians
21st-century Norwegian politicians